Victor Rosewater (February 13, 1871 – 1940) was a politician from the U. S. state of Nebraska.

Rosewater was born in Omaha, Nebraska, to Edward and Leah Rosewater .  His father was the founder of the Omaha Bee, which ran its first issue the year Victor was born.  He was educated at Johns Hopkins University in 1888 and then attended Columbia University, earning a PhD in 1893.  He returned to Omaha to work with his father and became managing editor in 1895.  He then served as a member of University of Nebraska board of regents 1896–97.  He served as a director of the Omaha Public Library 1894–1905 and the Omaha Board of Review in 1903.  Rosewater married Katie and had two children, Harriet and Edward Rosewater Jr.

In 1906, Rosewater helped his father run for the U.S. Senate as a Republican, yet unsuccessful against Norris Brown, who was also a Republican.  His father died on August 31, 1906 and he took over as managing editor of the Omaha Bee, becoming editor the following year.  At the time of his death, Rosewater senior had been involved in plans for launching the American Jewish Committee, and Victor assumed his father's role, becoming a founder of the AJC.  He was a Nebraska delegate to the 1908 Republican National Convention and a member of Republican National Committee, 1908–12, serving as its chairman in 1912 and planning its convention that year.

Rosewater later moved to Philadelphia, Pennsylvania, where he became involved in planning the Sesquicentennial Exposition, which celebrated the 150th anniversary of the signing of the Declaration of Independence. He continued his newspaper career writing columns for various papers and wrote an unpublished biography on his father.

He died at the age of 69.

External links
 
Rosewater Family Papers

Political Graveyard

1871 births
1940 deaths
American people of Czech-Jewish descent
Nebraska Republicans
Republican National Committee chairs
Jews and Judaism in Omaha, Nebraska
Pennsylvania Republicans
Politicians from Omaha, Nebraska